Ruwanwella electoral district was an electoral district of Sri Lanka between August 1947 and February 1989. The district was named after the town of Ruwanwella in Kegalle District, Sabaragamuwa Province. The 1978 Constitution of Sri Lanka introduced the proportional representation electoral system for electing members of Parliament. The existing 160 mainly single-member electoral districts were replaced with 22 multi-member electoral districts. Ruwanwella electoral district was replaced by the Kegalle multi-member electoral district at the 1989 general elections, the first under the proportional representation system.

Members of Parliament
Key

Elections

1947 Parliamentary General Election
Results of the 1st parliamentary election held between 23 August 1947 and 20 September 1947 for the district:

1952 Parliamentary General Election
Results of the 2nd parliamentary election held between 24 May 1952 and 30 May 1952 for the district:

1956 Parliamentary General Election
Results of the 3rd parliamentary election held between 5 April 1956 and 10 April 1956 for the district:

1960 (March) Parliamentary General Election
Results of the 4th parliamentary election held on 19 March 1960 for the district:

1960 (July) Parliamentary General Election
Results of the 5th parliamentary election held on 20 July 1960 for the district:

1965 Parliamentary General Election
Results of the 6th parliamentary election held on 22 March 1965 for the district:

1970 Parliamentary General Election
Results of the 7th parliamentary election held on 27 May 1970 for the district:

1977 Parliamentary General Election
Results of the 8th parliamentary election held on 21 July 1977 for the district:

References

Former electoral districts of Sri Lanka
Politics of Kegalle District